The Southern Baptist Convention (SBC) or Great Commission Baptists (GCB) is a Christian denomination based in the United States. It is the world's largest Baptist denomination, and the largest Protestant and second-largest Christian denomination in the United States. Organized in 1845, the denomination advocated for slavery in the United States. During the 19th and most of the 20th century, it played a central role in the culture and ethics of the South, supporting racial segregation and the Lost Cause of the Confederacy; it denounced interracial marriage as an "abomination", citing the Bible. In 1995, the organization apologized for its initial history. Since the 1940s, it has spread across the states, having member churches across the country and 41 affiliated state conventions, while keeping its original name. 

Southern or Great Commission Baptist churches are evangelical in doctrine and practice, emphasizing the significance of the individual conversion experience, which is affirmed by the person having complete immersion in water for a believer's baptism. The church says that other specific beliefs based on biblical interpretation can vary by congregational polity, and has resolved to balance local church autonomy with accountability against abuses by ministers and others in the church. These claims are disputed by pastors whose churches have been expelled because of their support for LGBTQ inclusion, which contradicts the confession of faith.

Beginning in 2018, investigations into top SBC officials have revealed a deliberate effort within the organization to suppress reports of sexual abuse and protect over 700 ministers and church workers who were credibly accused of sexual abuse. On May 22, 2022, Guidepost Solutions, an independent firm contracted by the SBC's executive committee, released a report detailing that SBC leaders had stonewalled and disparaged clergy sex abuse survivors for nearly two decades. The report alleged that nearly all efforts at reform had met with criticism and dismissal from other organization leaders. In addition to stonewalling and disparaging abuse survivors, the report stated that known abusers were allowed to keep their positions without informing their church or congregation. On August 12, 2022, the SBC announced that it was facing a federal investigation into the sex abuse scandal. 

Self-reported membership peaked in 2006 at roughly 16 million. Membership has contracted by an estimated 13.6% since that year, with 2020 marking the 14th year of continuous decline. Mean denomination-wide weekly attendance dropped about 27% between 2006 and 2020.

Name 
The official name is the Southern Baptist Convention. The word Southern in "Southern Baptist Convention" stems from its having been organized in 1845 in Augusta, Georgia, by white supremacist Baptists in the Southern United States who supported enslaving Americans of African descent and split from the northern Baptists (known today as the American Baptist Churches USA).

In 2012, the convention adopted the descriptor Great Commission Baptists after the election of its first African American president. Additionally, in 2020, some leaders of the Southern Baptists wanted to change its name to "Great Commission Baptists" to distance itself from its white supremacist foundation, and to no longer be a specifically Southern church. Several churches affiliated with the denomination have also begun to identify as "Great Commission Baptists".

History

Colonial era

Most early Baptists in the British colonies came from England in the 17th century, after conflict with the Church of England for their dissenting religious views. In 1638, Roger Williams founded the first Baptist church in British America at the Providence Plantations, the first permanent European American settlement also founded by Williams in Rhode Island. The oldest Baptist church in the South, First Baptist Church of Charleston, South Carolina, was organized in 1682 under the leadership of William Screven. A Baptist church was formed in Virginia in 1715 through the preaching of Robert Norden and another in North Carolina in 1727 through the ministry of Paul Palmer.

The Baptists adhered to a congregationalist polity and operated independently of the state-established Anglican churches in the South, at a time when non-Anglicans were prohibited from holding political office. By 1740, about eight Baptist churches existed in the colonies of Virginia, North Carolina, and South Carolina, with an estimated 300 to 400 members. New members, both black and white, were converted chiefly by Baptist preachers who traveled throughout the South during the 18th and 19th centuries, in the eras of the First and Second Great awakenings.

Black congregations and churches were founded in Virginia, South Carolina, and Georgia before the American Revolution. Some black congregations kept their independence even after whites tried to exercise more authority after the Nat Turner slave rebellion of 1831.

American Revolution period
Before the American Revolution, Baptist and Methodist evangelicals in the South promoted the view of the common man's equality before God, which embraced slaves and free blacks. They challenged the hierarchies of class and race and urged planters to abolish slavery. They welcomed slaves as Baptists and accepted them as preachers.

Isaac (1974) analyzes the rise of the Baptist church in Virginia, with emphasis on evangelicalism and social life. There was a sharp division between the austerity of the plain-living Baptists, attracted initially from yeomen and common planters, and the opulence of the Anglican planters, the slave-holding elite who controlled local and colonial government in what had become a slave society by the late 18th century. The gentry interpreted Baptist church discipline as political radicalism, but it served to ameliorate disorder. The Baptists intensely monitored each other's moral conduct, watching especially for sexual transgressions, cursing, and excessive drinking; they expelled members who would not reform.

In Virginia and in most southern colonies before the Revolution, the Church of England was the established church and supported by general taxes, as it was in England. It opposed the rapid spread of Baptists in the South. Particularly in Virginia, many Baptist preachers were prosecuted for "disturbing the peace" by preaching without licenses from the Anglican church. Patrick Henry and James Madison defended Baptist preachers before the American Revolution in cases considered significant in the history of religious freedom. In 1779, Thomas Jefferson wrote the Virginia Statute for Religious Freedom, enacted in 1786 by the Virginia General Assembly. Madison later applied his ideas and those of the Virginia document related to religious freedom during the Constitutional Convention, when he ensured that they were incorporated into the national constitution.

The struggle for religious tolerance erupted and played out during the American Revolution, as the Baptists worked to disestablish the Anglican church in the South. Beeman (1978) explores the conflict in one Virginia locality, showing that as its population became denser, the county court and the Anglican Church increased their authority. The Baptists protested vigorously; the resulting social disorder resulted chiefly from the ruling gentry's disregard for public need. The vitality of the religious opposition made the conflict between "evangelical" and "gentry" styles a bitter one. Kroll-Smith (1984) suggests that the evangelical movement's strength determined its ability to mobilize power outside the conventional authority structure.

National unification and regional division

In 1814, leaders such as Luther Rice helped Baptists unify nationally under what became known informally as the Triennial Convention (because it met every three years) based in Philadelphia. It allowed them to join their resources to support missions abroad. The Home Mission Society, affiliated with the Triennial Convention, was established in 1832 to support missions in U.S. frontier territories. By the mid-19th century, there were many social, cultural, economic, and political differences among business owners of the North, farmers of the West, and planters of the South. The most divisive conflict was primarily over the issue of slavery and secondarily over missions.

Divisions over slavery

The issues surrounding slavery dominated the 19th century in the United States. This created tension between Baptists in northern and southern states over the issue of manumission. In the two decades after the American Revolution during the Second Great Awakening, northern Baptist preachers (as well as the Quakers and Methodists) increasingly argued that slaves be freed. Although most Baptists in the 19th century south were yeomen farmers and common planters, the Baptists also began to attract major planters among their membership. The southern pastors interpreted the Bible as supporting slavery and encouraged paternalistic practices by slaveholders. They preached to slaves to accept their places and obey their masters, and welcomed slaves and free blacks as members, though whites controlled the churches' leadership, and seating was usually segregated. From the early 19th century, many Baptist preachers in the South also argued in favor of preserving the right of ministers to be slaveholders.

Black congregations were sometimes the largest in their regions. For instance, by 1821, Gillfield Baptist in Petersburg, Virginia, had the largest congregation within the Portsmouth Association. At 441 members, it was more than twice as large as the next-biggest church. Before the Nat Turner slave rebellion of 1831, Gillfield had a black preacher. Afterward, the state legislature insisted that white men oversee black congregations. Gillfield could not call a black preacher until after the American Civil War and emancipation. After Turner's rebellion, whites worked to exert more control over black congregations and passed laws requiring white ministers to lead or be present at religious meetings. Many slaves evaded these restrictions.

The Triennial Convention and the Home Mission Society adopted a kind of neutrality concerning slavery, neither condoning nor condemning it. During the "Georgia Test Case" of 1844, the Georgia State Convention proposed that the slaveholder Elder James E. Reeve be appointed as a missionary. The Foreign Mission Board refused to approve his appointment, recognizing the case as a challenge and not wanting to violate their neutrality on slavery. They said that slavery should not be introduced as a factor into deliberations about missionary appointments.

In 1844, University of Alabama president Basil Manly Sr., a prominent preacher and major planter who owned 40 slaves, drafted the "Alabama Resolutions" and presented them to the Triennial Convention. They included the demand that slaveholders be eligible for denominational offices to which the Southern associations contributed financially. They were not adopted. Georgia Baptists decided to test the claimed neutrality by recommending a slaveholder to the Home Mission Society as a missionary. The Home Mission Society's board refused to appoint him, noting that missionaries were not allowed to take servants with them (so he clearly could not take slaves) and that they would not make a decision that appeared to endorse slavery. Southern Baptists considered this an infringement of their right to determine their own candidates. From the southern perspective, the northern position that "slaveholding brethren were less than followers of Jesus" effectively obligated slaveholding Southerners to leave the fellowship. This difference came to a head in 1845 when representatives of the northern states refused to appoint missionaries whose families owned slaves. To continue in the work of missions, the southern Baptists separated and created the Southern Baptist Convention.

Missions and organization

A secondary issue that disturbed the Southerners was the perception that the American Baptist Home Mission Society did not appoint a proportionate number of missionaries to the southern United States. This was likely a result of the society's not appointing slave owners as missionaries. Baptists in the North preferred a loosely structured society of individuals who paid annual dues, with each society usually focused on a single ministry.

Baptists in Southern churches preferred a more centralized organization of churches patterned after their associations, with a variety of ministries brought under the direction of one denominational organization. The increasing tensions and the discontent of Baptists from the South over national criticism of slavery and issues over missions led to their withdrawal from national Baptist organizations.

The Southern Baptists met at the First Baptist Church of Augusta in May 1845. At this meeting, they created a new convention, the Southern Baptist Convention. They elected William Bullein Johnson (1782–1862) as its first president. He had served as president of the Triennial Convention in 1841, though he initially attempted to avoid a schism.

Formation and separation of Black Baptists

African Americans had gathered in their own churches early on, in 1774 in Petersburg, Virginia, and in Savannah, Georgia, in 1788. Some were established after 1800 on the frontier, such as the First African Baptist Church of Lexington, Kentucky. In 1824, it was accepted by the Elkhorn Association of Kentucky, which was white-dominated. By 1850, First African had 1,820 members, the largest of any Baptist church in the state, black or white. In 1861, it had 2,223 members.

Southern whites generally required black churches to have white ministers and trustees. In churches with mixed congregations, seating was segregated, with blacks often in a balcony. White preaching often emphasized Biblical stipulations that slaves should accept their places and try to behave well toward their masters. After the American Civil War, another split occurred when most freedmen set up independent black congregations, regional associations, and state and national conventions. Blacks wanted to practice Christianity independently of white supervision. They interpreted the Bible as offering hope for deliverance, and saw their own exodus out of slavery as comparable to the Exodus, with abolitionist John Brown as their Moses. They quickly left white-dominated churches and associations and set up separate state Baptist conventions. In 1866, black Baptists of the South and West combined to form the Consolidated American Baptist Convention. In 1895, they merged three national conventions to create the National Baptist Convention, USA, Inc. With more than eight million members, it is today the largest African American religious organization and second in size to the Southern Baptists.

Free blacks in the North had founded churches and denominations in the early 19th century that were independent of white-dominated organizations. In the Reconstruction era, missionaries both black and white from several northern denominations worked in the South; they quickly attracted tens and hundreds of thousands of new members from among the millions of freedmen. The African Methodist Episcopal Church attracted more new members than any other denomination. White Southern Baptist churches lost black members to the new denominations, as well as to independent congregations which were organized by freedmen.

During the Civil Rights movement, most Southern Baptist pastors and members of their congregations rejected racial integration and accepted white supremacy, further alienating African Americans. According to historian and former Southern Baptist Wayne Flynt, "The [Southern Baptist] church was the last bastion of segregation." But it has been acknowledged that the SBC integrated seminary classrooms in 1951.

In 1995, the convention voted to adopt a resolution in which it renounced its racist roots and apologized for its past defense of slavery, segregation, and white supremacy. This marked the denomination's first formal acknowledgment that racism had played a profound role in both its early and modern history.

21st century
By the early 21st century, numbers of ethnically diverse congregations were increasing among the Southern Baptists. In 2008, almost 20% were estimated to be majority African American, Asian, or Hispanic and Latino. The SBC had an estimated one million African American members. It has passed a series of resolutions recommending the inclusion of more black members and appointing more African American leaders. At its 2012 annual meeting, it elected Fred Luter Jr. as its first African American president. He had earned respect by showing leadership skills in building a large congregation in New Orleans.

The SBC's increasingly national scope has inspired some members to suggest a name change. In 2005, proposals were made at the SBC Annual Meeting to change the name to the more national-sounding "North American Baptist Convention" or "Scriptural Baptist Convention" (to retain the SBC initials). These proposals were defeated.

The messengers of the 2012 annual meeting in New Orleans voted to adopt the descriptor "Great Commission Baptists". The legal name remains "Southern Baptist Convention", but churches and convention entities can voluntarily use the descriptor.

Almost a year after the Charleston church shooting, the Southern Baptists approved Resolution 7, which called upon member churches and families to stop flying the Confederate flag.

The SBC approved Resolution 12, "On Refugee Ministry", encouraging member churches and families to welcome refugees coming to the United States. In the same convention, Russell Moore of the Southern Baptist Ethics and Religious Liberty Commission quickly responded to a pastor who asked why a Southern Baptist should support the right of Muslims living in the U.S. to build mosques. Moore responded, "Sometimes we have to deal with questions that are really complicated... this isn't one of them." Moore said that religious freedom must be for all religions.

From February to June 2016, the Southern Baptists collaborated with the National Baptist Convention, USA on racial reconciliation. SBC and NBC presidents Ronnie Floyd and Jerry Young assembled 10 pastors from each convention in 2015, discussing race relations; in 2016, Baptist Press and The New York Times revealed tension among National Baptists debating any collaboration with the SBC, quoting NBC President Young:

After an initial resolution denouncing the alt-right movement failed to make it the convention floor, the convention officially denounced the alt-right movement at the 2017 convention. On November 5, 2017, a mass shooting took place at the First Baptist Church of Sutherland Springs. It was the deadliest shooting to occur at any SBC church in its history and, in modern history, at an American place of worship.

The 2020 convention was canceled due to COVID-19 concerns and eventually rescheduled for June 2021.

In a Washington Post story dated September 15, 2020, Greear said some Southern Baptist Convention leaders wanted to change the official name of the church to "Great Commission Baptists" (GCB), to distance the church from its support of slavery and because it is no longer just a Southern church. Since then, several leaders and churches have begun adopting the alternative descriptor for their churches.

Beliefs
The general theological perspective of the churches of the Southern Baptist Convention is represented in the Baptist Faith and Message (BF&M). The BF&M was first drafted in 1925 as a revision of the 1833 New Hampshire Confession of Faith. It was revised significantly in 1963, amended in 1998 with the addition of one new section on the family, and revised again in 2000. The 1998 and 2000 changes were the subject of much controversy, particularly in regard to the role of women in the church.

The BF&M is not considered a creed, such as the Nicene Creed. Members are not required to adhere to it, and churches and state conventions belonging to the global body are not required to use it as their statement of faith or doctrine, though many do in lieu of creating their own statement. Nevertheless, key leaders, faculty in SBC-owned seminaries, and missionaries who apply to serve through the various missionary agencies must affirm that their practices, doctrine, and preaching are consistent with the BF&M.

In 2012, a LifeWay Research survey of Southern Baptist pastors found that 30% of congregations identified with the labels Calvinist or Reformed, while 30% identified with the labels Arminian or Wesleyan. LifeWay Research President Ed Stetzer said, "historically, many Baptists have considered themselves neither Calvinist nor Arminian, but holding a unique theological approach not framed well by either category". The survey also found that 60% of Southern Baptist pastors were concerned about Calvinism's impact within the convention. Nathan Finn writes that the debate over Calvinism has "periodically reignited with increasing intensity" and that non-Calvinists "seem to be especially concerned with the influence of Founders Ministries" while Calvinists "seem to be particularly concerned with the influence of revivalism and Keswick theology."

Historically, the SBC has not considered glossolalia or other Charismatic beliefs to be in accordance with Scriptural teaching, though the BF&M does not mention the subject. While officially few SBC churches are openly Charismatic, at least one Independent Baptist author believes the practice to be far commoner than officially acknowledged.

Position statements
In addition to the BF&M, the convention has also issued the following position statements:
 Autonomy of local church — Affirms the autonomy of the local church.
 Cooperation— Identifies the Cooperative Program of missions as integral to the Southern Baptist Convention.
 Creeds and confessions — Statements of belief are revisable in light of Scripture. The Bible is the final word.
 Missions — Honors the indigenous principle in missions. The SBC does not, however, compromise doctrine or its identity for missional opportunities.
 Priesthood of all believers — Laypersons have the same right as ordained ministers to communicate with God, interpret Scripture, and minister in Christ's name.
 Sanctity of life — "At the moment of conception, a new being enters the universe, a human being, a being created in God's image"; as such, it should be protected regardless of the circumstances underlying the conception. As such, the SBC opposes abortion and any form of birth control which acts as an abortifacient.
 Sexuality — They affirm God's plan for marriage and sexual intimacy as a lifetime relationship of one man and one woman. Explicitly, they do not consider homosexuality to be a "valid alternative lifestyle". They understand the Bible to forbid any form of extra-marital sexual relations.
Soul competency — Affirms the accountability of each person before God.
 Ordination of women — Women are not eligible to serve as pastors.

In 2022, the convention passed a resolution against prosperity theology, which it considers a distortion of the message of the Bible.

Ordinances

Southern or Great Commission Baptists observe two ordinances: the Lord's Supper and believer's baptism (also known as credo-baptism, from the Latin for "I believe"). Furthermore, they hold the historic Baptist belief that immersion is the only valid mode of baptism. The Baptist Faith and Message describes baptism as a symbolic act of obedience and a testimony of the believer's faith in Jesus Christ to other people. The BF&M also notes that baptism is a precondition to congregational church membership.

The BF&M holds to memorialism, which is the belief that the Lord's Supper is a symbolic act of obedience in which believers commemorate the death of Christ and look forward to his Second Coming. Although individual Southern Baptist churches are free to practice either open or closed communion (due to the convention's belief in congregational polity and the autonomy of the local church), most Southern Baptist churches practice open communion. For the same reason, the frequency of observance of the Lord's Supper varies from church to church. It is commonly observed quarterly, though some churches offer it monthly and a small minority offers it weekly. Because Southern Baptists traditionally have opposed alcoholic beverage consumption by members, grape juice is used instead of wine (and is usually called "the cup" as a result).

Gender-based roles
Southern or Great Commission Baptists subscribe to the complementarian view of gender roles. Beginning in the early 1970s, as a reaction to their perceptions of various "women's liberation movements", the SBC, along with several other historically conservative Baptist groups, began to assert its view of the propriety and primacy of what it deemed "traditional gender roles" as a body. In 1973, at the annual meeting of the Southern Baptist Convention, delegates passed a resolution which read in part: "Man was not made for woman, but the woman for the man. Woman is the glory of man. Woman would not have existed without man." In 1998, the SBC appended a male leadership understanding of marriage to the 1963 version of the Baptist Faith and Message, with an official amendment: Article XVIII, "The Family". In 2000, it revised the document to reflect support for a male-only pastorate with no mention of the office of deacon.

In the pastorate

By explicitly defining the pastoral office as the exclusive domain of males, the 2000 BF&M provision becomes the convention's first-ever official position against women pastors.

As individual churches affiliated with the SBC are autonomous, local congregations cannot be compelled to adopt a male-only pastorate. Though neither the BF&M nor the convention's constitution and bylaws provide any mechanism to trigger automatic removal ("disfellowship") of congregations that adopt practices or theology contrary to the BF&M, some Southern Baptist churches that have installed women as their pastors have been disfellowshipped from membership in their local SBC associations; a smaller number have been disfellowshipped from their SBC state conventions.

The crystallization of Southern Baptist positions on gender roles and restrictions of women's participation in the pastorate contributed to the decision by members now belonging to the Cooperative Baptist Fellowship which broke from the SBC in 1991.

In marriage
The 2000 BF&M prescribes a husband-headship authority structure, closely following the apostle Paul's exhortations in :

Worship services

Most Southern Baptists observe a low church form of worship, which is less formal and uses no stated liturgy. The form of the worship services generally depend on whether the congregation uses a traditional service or a contemporary one, or a mix of both—the main differences being with regards to music and the response to the sermon.

In both types of services, there will be a prayer at the opening of the service, before the sermon, and at closing. Offerings are taken, which may be around the middle of the service or at the end (with the increased popularity of electronic financial systems, some churches operate kiosks allowing givers the opportunity to do so online, or through a phone app or website link). Responsive Scripture readings are not common, but may be done on a special occasion.

In a traditional service, the music generally features hymns, accompanied by a piano or organ (the latter has been generally phased out due to a shift in worship preferences) and sometimes with a special featured soloist or choir. Smaller churches generally let anyone participate in the choir regardless of actual singing ability; larger churches will limit participation to those who have successfully tried out for a role. After the sermon, an invitation to respond (sometimes termed an altar call) might be given; people may respond during the invitation by receiving Jesus Christ as Lord and Savior and beginning Christian discipleship, seeking baptism or requesting to join the congregation, or entering into vocational ministry or making some other publicly stated decision. Baptisms may be scheduled on specific weekends, or (especially in buildings with built-in baptisteries) be readily available for anyone desiring baptism.

In a contemporary service, the music generally features modern songs led by a praise team or similarly named group with featured singers. Choirs are not as common. An altar call may or may not be given at the end; if it is not, interested persons are directed to seek out people in the lobby who can address any questions. Baptismal services are usually scheduled as specific and special events. Also, church membership is usually done on a periodic basis by attending specific classes about the church's history, beliefs, what it seeks to accomplish, and what is expected of a prospective member. Controversially, a member may be asked to sign a "membership covenant", a document that has the prospective member promise to perform certain tasks (regular church attendance both at main services and small groups, regular giving—sometimes even requiring tithing, and service within the church). Such covenants are highly controversial: among other things, such a covenant may not permit a member to voluntarily withdraw from membership to avoid church discipline or, in some cases, the member cannot leave at all (even when not under discipline) without the approval of church leadership. A Dallas/Fort Worth church was forced to apologize to a member who attempted to do so for failing to request permission to annul her marriage after her husband admitted to viewing child pornography.

Race 
During the 19th and most of the 20th century, the organization supported white supremacy, racial segregation, the Confederacy, and the Lost Cause. The organization also denounced interracial marriage as an "abomination", citing the Bible. With the advent of the civil rights movement in the 20th century, the Southern Baptists officially denounced racism and its white supremacist history. At the beginning of the 21st century, the convention adopted the "Great Commission Baptists" descriptor, which began to gain prominent use among several churches desiring to sever themselves from its white supremacist history and controversies.

Statistics

Membership

According to a denomination census released in 2020, it has 47,530 churches and 14,525,579 members. In an alternative report by the Association of Religion Data Archives in 2020, Southern Baptists numbered 17,649,040 altogether, spread out in 51,379 affiliated churches.

The global convention has 1,161 local associations and 42 state conventions, and fellowships covering all fifty states and territories of the United States. The five states with the highest rates of membership are Texas, Georgia, North Carolina, Florida, and Tennessee. Texas has the largest number of members with an estimated 2.75 million. Within Texas, these numerous Southern Baptists are divided among the more traditionalist Southern Baptists of Texas Convention and more moderate, diversified Baptist General Convention of Texas.

Through the Cooperative Program, Southern or Great Commission Baptists support thousands of missionaries in the United States and worldwide.

Trends
Data from church sources and independent surveys indicate that since 1990 membership of Southern Baptist churches has declined as a proportion of the American population. Historically, the convention grew throughout its history until 2007, when membership decreased by a net figure of nearly 40,000 members. The total membership, of about 16.2 million, was flat over the same period, falling by 38,482 or 0.2%. An important indicator for the health of the denomination is new baptisms, which have decreased every year for seven of the last eight years. , they had reached their lowest levels since 1987. Membership continued to decline from 2008 to 2012. The convention's statistical summary of 2014 recorded a loss of 236,467 members, their biggest one-year decline since 1881. In 2018, membership fell below 15 million for the first time since 1989 and reached its lowest level for over 30 years.

This decline in membership and baptisms has prompted some SBC researchers to describe the convention as a "denomination in decline". In 2008, former SBC president Frank Page suggested that if current conditions continue, half of all Southern Baptist churches will close their doors permanently by 2030. This assessment is supported by a 2004 survey of SBC churches which indicated that 70 percent of all SBC churches are declining or are plateaued with regards to their membership.

The decline in membership among Southern Baptists was an issue discussed during the June 2008 Annual Convention. Curt Watke, a former researcher for the SBC, noted four reasons for the decline of the SBC based on his research: the increase in immigration by non-European groups, decline in growth among predominantly European American (white) churches, the aging of the current membership, and a decrease in the percentage of younger generations participating in any church life. Some believe that the Baptists have not worked sufficiently to attract minorities.

On the other hand, the state conventions of Mississippi and Texas report an increasing portion of minority members. In 1990, five percent of Southern Baptist congregations were non-white. In 2012, the proportion of Southern Baptist congregations that were of other ethnic groups (African American, Latino, and Asian) had increased to twenty percent. Sixty percent of the minority congregations were found in Texas, particularly in the suburbs of Houston and Dallas.

The decline in SBC-GCB membership may be more pronounced than these statistics indicate because Baptist churches are not required to remove inactive members from their rolls, likely leading to greatly inflated membership numbers. In addition, hundreds of large moderate congregations have shifted their primary allegiance to other Baptist groups such as the American Baptist Churches USA, the Alliance of Baptists or the Cooperative Baptist Fellowship but have continued to remain nominally on the books of the convention. Their members are thus counted in the convention's totals although these churches no longer participate in the annual convention meetings or make more than the minimum financial contributions.

In some cases, groups have withdrawn from the convention because of its conservative trends. On November 6, 2000, the Baptist General Convention of Texas voted to cut its contributions to Southern Baptist seminaries and reallocate more than five million dollars in funds to three theological seminaries in the state which members believe were more moderate. These include the Hispanic Baptist Theological School in San Antonio, Baylor University's George W. Truett Theological Seminary in Waco, and Hardin–Simmons University's Logsdon School of Theology in Abilene. Since the controversies of the 1980s, more than twenty theological or divinity programs directed toward moderate and progressive Baptists have been established in the Southeast. In addition to Texas, schools in Virginia, Georgia, North Carolina and Alabama were established in the 1990s. These include the Baptist Theological Seminary in Richmond, McAfee School of Theology of Mercer University in Atlanta, Wake Forest, Gardner Webb and Campbell Divinity schools in North Carolina and Beeson Divinity School at Samford University, to name a few. These schools contributed to the flat and declining enrollment at Southern Baptist seminaries operating in the same region of the United States. Texas and Virginia have the largest state conventions identified as moderate in theological approach.

On June 4, 2020, the Southern Baptist Convention reported a drop in its membership—the 13th consecutive year that membership has declined. Total membership in the Southern Baptist Convention fell almost 2 percent to 14,525,579 from 2018 to 2019. The decline of 287,655 members is the largest single-year drop in more than 100 years.

Organization
There are four levels of SBC organization: the local congregation, the local association, the state convention, and the national convention. There are 41 affiliated state conventions or fellowships.

The national and state conventions and local associations are conceived as a cooperative association by which churches can voluntarily pool resources to support missionary and other work. Because of the basic Baptist principle of the autonomy of the local church and the congregationalist polity of the SBC, neither the national convention nor the state conventions or local associations has any administrative or ecclesiastical control over local churches; such a group may disfellowship a local congregation over an issue, but may not terminate its leadership or members or force its closure. The national convention has no authority over state conventions or local associations, nor do state conventions have authority over local associations. Furthermore, no individual congregation has any authority over any other individual congregation; a church may oversee another congregation voluntarily as a mission work, but that other congregation has the right to become an independent congregation at any time.

The convention maintains a central administrative organization in Nashville, Tennessee. The SBC's executive committee exercises authority and control over seminaries and other institutions owned by the Southern Baptist Convention.

The Southern Baptist Convention has around 10,000 ethnic congregations. Commitment to the autonomy of local congregations was the primary force behind the Executive Committee's rejection of a proposal to create a convention-wide database of SBC clergy accused of sexual crimes against congregants or other minors in order to stop the "recurring tide" of clergy sexual abuse within SBC congregations. A 2009 study by Lifeway Christian Resources, the convention's research and publishing arm, revealed that one in eight background checks for potential volunteers or workers in Southern Baptist churches revealed a history of crime that could have prevented them from working.

The convention's statement of faith, the Baptist Faith and Message, is not binding on churches or members due to the autonomy of the local church (though SBC employees and missionaries must agree to its views as a condition of employment or missionary support). Politically and culturally, Southern Baptists tend to be conservative. Most oppose homosexual activity and abortion.

Pastor and deacon
Generally, Baptists recognize only two scriptural offices: pastor-teacher and deacon. The Southern Baptist Convention passed a resolution in the early 1980s recognizing that offices requiring ordination are restricted to men. According to the Baptist Faith and Message, the office of pastor is limited to men based on certain New Testament scriptures. However, there is no prohibition in the Baptist Faith and Message against women serving as deacons. Neither the BF&M or resolutions are binding upon local churches. Each church is responsible to search the Scriptures and establish its own policies based on how they decide to interpret the scripture.

Annual meeting

The Southern Baptist Convention Annual Meeting (held in June, over a two-day period) consists of delegates (called "messengers") from cooperating churches. The messengers confer and determine the programs, policies, and budget of the SBC and elect the officers and committees. Each cooperating church is allowed up to two messengers regardless of the amount given to SBC entities, and may have more depending on the amount of giving (either in terms of dollars or percent of the church's budget), but the maximum number of messengers permitted from any church is 12.

Missions and affiliated organizations

Cooperative Program
The Cooperative Program (CP) is the convention's unified funds collection and distribution program for the support of regional, national and international ministries; the CP is funded by contributions from SBC congregations.

In the fiscal year ending September 30, 2008, the local congregations of the SBC reported gift receipts of $11.1 billion. From this they sent $548 million, approximately five percent, to their state Baptist conventions through the CP. Of this amount, the state Baptist conventions retained $344 million for their work. Two hundred and four million dollars was sent on to the national CP budget for the support of denomination-wide ministries.

Missions agencies
The Southern Baptist Convention was organized in 1845 primarily for the purpose of creating a mission board to support the sending of Baptist missionaries, albeit slaveholding missionaries. The North American Mission Board, or NAMB, (founded as the Domestic Mission Board, and later the Home Mission Board) in Alpharetta, Georgia serves missionaries involved in evangelism and church planting in the U.S. and Canada, while the International Mission Board, or IMB, (originally the Foreign Mission Board) in Richmond, Virginia, sponsors missionaries to the rest of the world.

Baptist Men is the mission organization for men in Southern Baptist churches, and is under the North American Mission Board.

The Woman's Missionary Union, founded in 1888, is an auxiliary to the Southern Baptist Convention, which helps facilitate two large annual missions offerings: the Annie Armstrong Easter Offering (for North American missions) and the Lottie Moon Christmas Offering (for international missions).

Southern Baptist Disaster Relief

Among the more visible organizations within the North American Mission Board is Southern Baptist Disaster Relief. In 1967, a small group of Texas Southern Baptist volunteers helped victims of Hurricane Beulah by serving hot food cooked on small "buddy burners." In 2005, volunteers responded to 166 named disasters, prepared 17,124,738 meals, repaired 7,246 homes, and removed debris from 13,986 yards. Southern Baptist Disaster Relief provides many different types: food, water, child care, communication, showers, laundry, repairs, rebuilding, or other essential tangible items that contribute to the resumption of life following the crisis—and the message of the Gospel. All assistance is provided to individuals and communities free of charge. SBC DR volunteer kitchens prepare much of the food distributed by the Red Cross in major disasters.

Schools

The convention has various affiliated primary and secondary schools, gathered in the Southern Baptist Association of Christian Schools. It also has several affiliated universities.

The SBC directly supports six theological seminaries devoted to ministry preparation.

 Southern Baptist Theological Seminary, Louisville, Kentucky (1859, originally in Greenville, South Carolina)
 Southwestern Baptist Theological Seminary, Fort Worth, Texas (1908, originally part of Baylor University in Waco, Texas).
 New Orleans Baptist Theological Seminary, New Orleans, Louisiana (1916, originally New Orleans Baptist Bible Institute)
 Gateway Seminary, Ontario, California (1944, originally in Oakland, California, and formerly called Golden Gate Baptist Theological Seminary)
 Southeastern Baptist Theological Seminary, Wake Forest, North Carolina (1950)
 Midwestern Baptist Theological Seminary, Kansas City, Missouri (1957)

Other organizations
 Baptist Press, the largest Christian news service in the country, was established by the SBC in 1946.
 Baptist Collegiate Network, the college-level organization operating campus and international missions typically known as the Baptist Student Union and Baptist Collegiate Ministries.
 GuideStone Financial Resources (formerly called the Annuity Board of the Southern Baptist Convention, and founded in 1918 as the Relief Board of the Southern Baptist Convention) exists to provide insurance, retirement, and investment services to churches and to ministers and employees of Southern Baptist churches and agencies (however, it does not limit its services to SBC churches and members only). Like many financial institutions during that time period, it underwent a severe financial crisis in the 1930s.
 LifeWay Christian Resources, founded as the Baptist Sunday School Board in 1891, which is one of the largest Christian publishing houses in America. It previously operated the "LifeWay Christian Stores" (formerly "Baptist Book Stores") chain of bookstores, until closing all stores in 2019 (but still operates an online service).
 Ethics & Religious Liberty Commission (formerly known as the Christian Life Commission of the SBC) is an entity of the Southern Baptist Convention that is dedicated to addressing social and moral concerns and their implications on public policy issues from City Hall to Congress and the courts (among other things it files amici briefs on various cases where religious liberty is potentially threatened). Its mission is "To awaken, inform, energize, equip, and mobilize Christians to be the catalysts for the Biblically-based transformation of their families, churches, communities, and the nation."
 The Southern Baptist Historical Library and Archives, in Nashville, Tennessee, serves as the official depository for the archives of the Southern Baptist Convention and a research center for the study of Baptists worldwide. The website for the SBHLA includes digital resources.

Controversies
During its history, the Southern Baptist Convention has had several periods of major internal controversy—from its establishment to the present day.

Landmark controversy
In the 1850s–1860s, a group of young activists called for a return to certain early practices, or what they called Landmarkism. Other leaders disagreed with their assertions, and the Baptist congregations became split on the issues. Eventually, the disagreements led to the formation of Gospel Missions and the American Baptist Association (1924), as well as many unaffiliated independent churches. One historian called the related James Robinson Graves—Robert Boyte Crawford Howell controversy (1858–60) the greatest to affect the denomination before that of the late 20th century involving the fundamentalist-moderate break.

Whitsitt controversy
In the Whitsitt controversy of 1896–99, William H. Whitsitt, a professor at Southern Baptist Theological Seminary, suggested that, contrary to earlier thought, English Baptists did not begin to baptize by immersion until 1641, when some Anabaptists, as they were then called, began to practice immersion. This overturned the idea of immersion as the practice of the earliest Baptists as some of the Landmarkists contended.

Moderates–conservatives controversy

The Southern Baptist Convention conservative resurgence was an intense struggle for control of the SBC's resources and ideological direction. The major internal disagreement captured national attention. Its initiators called it a "Conservative Resurgence", while its detractors have labeled it a "Fundamentalist Takeover". Russell H. Dilday, president of the Southwestern Baptist Theological Seminary from 1978 to 1994, described the resurgence as having fragmented Southern Baptist fellowship and as being "far more serious than [a controversy]". Dilday described it as being "a self-destructive, contentious, one-sided feud that at times took on combative characteristics". Since 1979, Southern Baptists had become polarized into two major groups: moderates and conservatives. Reflecting the conservative majority votes of messengers at the 1979 annual meeting of the SBC, the new national organization officers replaced all leaders of Southern Baptist agencies with presumably more conservative people (often dubbed "fundamentalist" by dissenters).

Among historical elements illustrating this trend, the organization's position on abortion rights within a decade had shifted radically from a position that supported them to a position that strongly opposes them, as in 1971, (two years before Roe v. Wade), the SBC passed a resolution supporting abortion, not only in cases of rape or incest—positions which even some Southern Baptist conservatives would support—but also as "clear evidence of severe fetal deformity, and carefully ascertained evidence of the likelihood of damage to the emotional, mental, and physical health of the mother"—positions not supported by the conservative wing. Also, in 1974, (the year after Roe v. Wade) the SBC passed another resolution affirming its previous 1971 resolution, saying that it "dealt responsibly from a Christian perspective with complexities of abortion problems in contemporary society" while also in the same resolution claiming that the SBC "historically held a high view of the sanctity of human life". However, once the conservatives won their first election in 1980, they passed a resolution which completely reversed their prior positions on abortion, condemning it in all cases except to save the life of the mother. As such, all subsequent resolutions on the issue have followed the 1980 trend of being strongly against abortion and have gone further into opposing similar issues such as fetal tissue experimentation, RU-486, and taxpayer funding of abortions in general and Planned Parenthood in particular.

In 1987, a group of churches criticized the fundamentalists for controlling the leadership and founded the Alliance of Baptists. In 1990, a group of moderate churches criticized the denomination for the same reasons, as well as opposition to women's ministry, and founded the Cooperative Baptist Fellowship in 1991.

Critical race theory
In November 2020, the six SBC seminary presidents called critical race theory "unbiblical" and emphasized the need to turn not secular ideas, to confront racism, but to Word of God in the love of Christ. At least four African American churches left the denomination over the leadership's refusal to recognize critical race theory.

Sexual abuse scandal 

On February 10, 2019, a joint investigation by the Houston Chronicle and the San Antonio Express found that there had been over 700 victims of sexual abuse by nearly 400 Southern Baptist church leaders, pastors and volunteers over the previous 20 years.

In 2018, the Houston Chronicle verified details in hundreds of accounts of abuse. It examined federal and state court databases, prison records and official documents from more than 20 states and researched sex offender registries nationwide. The Chronicle compiled a list of records and information (current as of June 2019), listing church pastors, leaders, employees and volunteers who have pleaded guilty to or were convicted of sex crimes.

On June 12, 2019, during their annual meeting, SBC messengers, who assembled that year in Birmingham, Alabama, approved a resolution condemning sex abuse and establishing a special committee to investigate sex abuse, which will make it easier for SBC churches to be excommunicated from the convention. The Reverend J. D. Greear, president of the Southern Baptist Convention and pastor of The Summit Church in Durham, North Carolina, called the move a "defining moment." Ronnie Floyd, president of the SBC's executive committee, echoed Greear's remarks, calling the vote "a very, very significant moment in the history of the Southern Baptist Convention."

In June 2021, letters from former policy director Russell D. Moore to SBC leadership were leaked. In the letters, Moore described how the convention had mishandled claims of sexual abuse.

On May 22, 2022, Guidepost Solutions, an independent firm contracted by the SBC's executive committee, released a report detailing that SBC leaders had stonewalled and disparaged clergy sex abuse survivors for nearly two decades. This was the largest investigation undertaken in the SBC's history at the time, with $4 million reportedly spent by the organization to fund the inquiry. In addition to stonewalling and disparaging abuse survivors, the report also stated that known abusers were allowed to keep their positions without informing their church or congregation. The report alleged that while the SBC had elected a president, J. D. Greear, in 2018 who made addressing sexual abuse a central part of his agenda, nearly all efforts at reform had been met with criticism and dismissal from other organization leaders.

On June 14, 2022, the SBC voted "to create a way to track pastors and other church workers credibly accused of sex abuse and launch a new task force to oversee further reforms" after a consultant exposed that "Southern Baptist leaders mishandled abuse cases and stonewalled victims for years". The new task force will operate for one year, with the option to continue longer.

On August 12, 2022, the SBC announced that it was facing a federal investigation into the sex abuse scandal.

Excommunications 
Since 1992, the convention has carried out excommunications of various churches that support LGBTQ inclusion, a belief that contradicts the confession of faith. In 2018, the District of Columbia Baptist Convention was excommunicated for this reason. It has also excommunicated or disfellowshipped churches for ordaining women, most notably Saddleback Church.

See also

 List of Baptist denominations
 List of Southern Baptist Convention affiliated people
 List of the largest Protestant denominations
 Protestantism in the United States
 Southern Baptist Convention Presidents
 Christian views on slavery
 Christianity in the United States
 Religion in the United States

Notes

References

Footnotes

Bibliography

Further reading

 .
 .
 .
 .
 Barnes, William. The Southern Baptist Convention, 1845–1953 Broadman Press, 1954.
 Eighmy, John. Churches in Cultural Captivity: A History of the Social Attitudes of Southern Baptists. University of Tennessee Press, 1972.
 Encyclopedia of Southern Baptists: Presenting Their History, Doctrine, Polity, Life, Leadership, Organization & Work Knoxville: Broadman Press, v 1–2 (1958), 1500 pp; 2 supplementary volumes 1958 and 1962; vol 5. Index, 1984
 Farnsley II, Arthur Emery, Southern Baptist Politics: Authority and Power in the Restructuring of an American Denomination; Pennsylvania State University Press, 1994
 Flowers, Elizabeth H. Into the Pulpit: Southern Baptist Women and Power Since World War II (University of North Carolina Press; 2012) 263 pages; examines women's submission to male authority as a pivotal issue in the clash between conservatives and moderates in the SBC
 Fuller, A. James. Chaplain to the Confederacy: Basil Manly and Baptist Life in the Old South (2002)
 Gatewood, Willard. Controversy in the 1920s: Fundamentalism, Modernism, and Evolution. Vanderbilt University Press, 1969.
 Harvey, Paul. Redeeming the South: Religious Cultures and Racial Identities among Southern Baptists, 1865–1925. University of North Carolina Press, 1997
 Hill, Samuel, et al. Encyclopedia of Religion in the South (2005)
 Hunt, Alma. Woman's Missionary Union (1964) Online free
 Kell, Carl L. and L. Raymond Camp, In the Name of the Father: The Rhetoric of the New Southern Baptist Convention. Southern Illinois University Press, 1999.
 Kidd, Thomas S. and Barry Hankins. Baptists in America: A History. Oxford, England: Oxford University Press, 2015.
 Leonard, Bill J. God's Last and Only Hope: The Fragmentation of the Southern Baptist Convention. Eerdmans Publishing Co., 1990.
 Lumpkin, William L. Baptist History in the South: Tracing through the Separates the Influence of the Great Awakening, 1754–1787 (1995)
 McSwain, Larry L. Loving Beyond Your Theology: The Life and Ministry of Jimmy Raymond Allen (Mercer University Press; 2010) 255 pages. A biography of the Arkansas-born pastor (b. 1927), who was the last moderate president of the SBC
 Marsden, George. Fundamentalism and American Culture: The Shaping of 20th Century Evangelicalism. Oxford University Press, 1980.
 .
 .
 Scales, T. Laine. All That Fits a Woman: Training Southern Baptist Women for Charity and Mission, 1907–1926 Mercer U. Press 2002
 Smith, Oran P. The Rise of Baptist Republicanism (1997), on recent voting behavior
 Spain, Rufus B. At Ease in Zion: A Social History of Southern Baptists, 1865–1900 (1961)
 Sutton, Jerry. The Baptist Reformation: The Conservative Resurgence in the Southern Baptist Convention (2000).
 Wills, Gregory A. Democratic Religion: Freedom, Authority, and Church Discipline in the Baptist South, 1785–1900. Oxford University Press, 1997
 Yarnell III, Malcolm B. The Formation of Christian Doctrine (2007), on Baptist theology

External links

 
 

 
Religious organizations established in 1845
Evangelical denominations in North America
1845 establishments in the United States
Organizations based in Georgia (U.S. state)
Augusta, Georgia
White supremacy in the United States
History of the Southern United States
Religion in the United States
History of religion in the United States
Religious belief systems founded in the United States